The 2022 Cazoo Players Championship Finals was the fifteenth edition of the PDC darts tournament, which saw the top 64 players from the 2022 PDC Players Championship series take part. The tournament took place from 25–27 November 2022 at the Butlin's Resort, Minehead.

Peter Wright was the defending champion, after defeating Ryan Searle 11–10 in the 2021 final. However, he did not defend his title after withdrawing for family reasons.

Michael van Gerwen won the tournament for a seventh time, defeating Rob Cross 11–6 in the final, hitting the tournament's only nine-dart finish and a 170 checkout in the final.

In a slight change to the usual format, and to avoid a direct clash with England’s 2022 FIFA World Cup group match with the USA which took place on the evening of the opening night of the competition, all matches in the first round were played during the day in a single bumper session.

Prize money
The 2022 Players Championship Finals prize fund remained at £500,000, before going up to £600,000 in 2023.

The following is the breakdown of the fund:

Qualification
The top 64 players from the Players Championships Order of Merit qualified, which is solely based on prize money won in the 30 Players Championship events during the season. Peter Wright withdrew from the event for family reasons and was directly replaced in the draw by Gian van Veen.

The following players qualified:

Top 64 in the Players Championship Order of Merit

Draw
There was no draw held; all players were put in a fixed bracket by their seeding positions.

Finals

Top half

Section 1

Section 2

Bottom half

Section 3

Section 4

Top averages
The table lists all players who achieved an average of at least 100 in a match. In the case one player has multiple records, this is indicated by the number in brackets.

References

Players Championship Finals
Players
Players
Players